Nicholas Olsen is an Australian professional footballer who plays as a winger for V.League 1 side SHB Danang.

Club career

Saigon FC
In August 2022, Olsen joined V.League 1 side Saigon. He scored 5 goals in 11 appearances for the club before sitting out the remaining two matched of the 2022 V.League 1 season due to a wage dispute.

SHB Danang
Following the conclusion of the 2022 V.League 1 season, Olsen signed with SHB Danang.

References

External links

Living people
1995 births
Australian soccer players
Association football forwards
Brisbane Roar FC players
A-League Men players
National Premier Leagues players
Sydney United 58 FC players
Sutherland Sharks FC players
V.League 1 players